Carson Helicopters, Inc is a helicopter operating company based in Perkasie, Pennsylvania, United States. Carson operates a fleet of Sikorsky S-61 helicopters in aerial lift services and aerial firefighting.  Carson is known for its development of the "Carson Blade" for the S-61 and H-3 Sea King. In 2010, Carson Helicopters, Inc. partnered with Sikorsky Aircraft to develop and manufacture the S-61T, an upgraded version of the S-61 helicopter.

In 2015 former VP Steve Metheny was sentenced to prison for falsifying documents that led to a 2008 crash that killed seven firefighters and two pilots. A federal jury had earlier found that the primary cause of the crash was the failure of the GE designed engine, specifically issues with the engine's fuel control, of which GE had previously been notified.

Upgrade Programs

British Royal Navy Upgrade Program 
In 2007, Carson Helicopters partnered with the British Royal Navy to modernize its British HC4 Sea King Helicopters because British forces faced issues operating the Sea Kings in Afghanistan due to the country’s altitude above sea level and lower air density which contributed to a dramatic decrease in lift and forward speed.

The upgrades included the replacement of the aircraft’s legacy metal main rotor blades with the Carson Composite Main Rotor Blade and to use Agusta Wesland’s five-bladed composite tail rotor.  Within 12 months after installation, the upgrades were tested and deployed after receiving a UOR from the MoD.

The increased performance provided by the Carson Composite Main Rotor Blades enabled the aircraft to operate at its operational and design capability in hot-and-high environments without having to strip weight or decrease defensive aids, such as armor or weaponry and its associated ammunition.

S-61T Program 
In February 2010, the U.S. State Department signed an open-ended contract for as many as 110 Sikorsky S-61 Triton Helicopters ("S-61T") for U.S. diplomatic transportation and cargo services.

The S-61T, which was an upgraded SH3H, included a fully modernized glass cockpit with digital screens and avionics, crashworthy seats, a modular wiring harness derived from the UH-60 Black Hawk, as well as engine and transmission improvements.  Upgrades also included the Carson Composite Main Rotor Blades which provided a 10 knot increase in cruising speed using the same horsepower and a 1750 lb. increase in lift.

Incidents and accidents

 On 9 June 2008 workers from Carson Helicopters sparked a fire in the Great Dismal Swamp National Wildlife Refuge which burned for 111 days. Carson Helicopters had been in the process of completing a 1,110 acre clearing project to remove trees damaged by Hurricane Isabel in 2003 when sparks from logging equipment touched off the blaze  A federal contract with Carson Helicopters allowed the company to keep valuable cedar recovered during the clean up effort in exchange for also removing unusable timber. The fire was declared out on October 7, 2008. Total cost to suppress the 4 month, 4,884-acre blaze has been estimated at over $12.5 million.
 On 5 August 2008 a Carson Helicopters Sikorsky S-61N (tail number  crashed on take off. According to the NTSB, nine people were killed. These were the pilot-in-command, Roark Schwanenberg, 54, of Lostine, Forest Service safety official Jim Ramage, 63, and seven firefighters: Shawn Blazer, 30, of Medford; Scott Charlson, 25, of Phoenix, Ore.; Matthew Hammer, 23, of Grants Pass; Edrik Gomez, 19, of Ashland; Bryan Rich, 29, of Medford; David Steele, 19, of Ashland; and Steven "Caleb" Renno, 21, of Cave Junction. The copilot and three firefighters escaped the burning wreckage and survived with serious injuries. The NTSB's preliminary report determined that the cause was a loss of power on take off probably caused by an engine failure. In January 2010 the NTSB issued its final report finding that the probable causes of this accident were several actions by Carson Helicopters: intentional understatement of the helicopter's empty weight; alteration of the power available chart to exaggerate the helicopter's lift capability; using unapproved torque in performance calculations; and that additional causes were insufficient oversight by the U.S. Forest Service and the Federal Aviation Administration.  Relatives of the victims concerned by the change in the NTSB report filed a lawsuit against General Electric and on March 27, 2012 a jury unanimously ruled that the primary cause of the accident was the failure of the GE CT-58 engines.
 In February 2013, two former Carson Helicopters employees were indicted over charges related to the August 2008 crash. A federal grand jury in Medford, Oregon indicted Steven Metheny, a former Vice President of Carson, and Levi Phillips, the former maintenance chief of the company. Charges of conspiracy to defraud the United States were filed against both, with Metheny also being charged with other violations including mail fraud, wire fraud, making false statements to the Forest Service, and endangering the safety of an aircraft in flight. The U.S. Attorneys office also accused Metheny of "stealing continuously from Carson," and using "Carson funds to buy jewelry and other personal items for himself and his wife and to renovate their residence and sold Carson helicopter parts and equipment and diverted the proceeds for his own use." The findings of  the National Transportation Safety Board in 2010 stated there was “intentional wrong-doing” by Carson Helicopters that under-stated the weight of the Sikorsky S-61N helicopter and over-stated its performance in their bid to the USFS on $20 million in contracts for seven helicopters. A Federal jury found that the August 2008 accident was 23% due to this understatement of weight and overstatement of performance.
In September 2013, former maintenance chief of Carson, Levi Phillips, admitted fraud and pleaded guilty in a deal that includes his full cooperation with the investigation, and testifying against former Carson VP Metheny 
In June 2015, former Carson VP Steven Metheny was sentenced to 12 years, 7 months in prison for falsifying documents that led to the 2008 crash.

References

External links
 Carson Helicopters on Airliners.net

Helicopter operators
Privately held companies based in Pennsylvania
American companies established in 1963
Companies based in Bucks County, Pennsylvania
Aerial firefighting
Logging in the United States
1963 establishments in Pennsylvania